Dodd is a small fell in the Lake District, Cumbria, England, four kilometres north-west of Keswick. It forms part of the Skiddaw range in the northern part of the national park and the slopes are heavily wooded.

Forestry
Dodd lies on Forestry England land known as Dodd Wood; for many years it was extensively planted with conifers right up to the summit which obstructed the view. However, Forestry England started a programme of tree clearance from the top of the fell in 2001 and the summit of the fell is now clear; it is hoped that it will revert to heather moorland in years to come. Influential guidebook author Alfred Wainwright voiced strong opposition to the afforestation of Dodd in his Pictorial Guides to the Lakeland Fells in 1962; it took 40 years for his wishes to come true.

Height
The fell has a height of 502 metres, though the Ordnance Survey's 1:50,000 Landranger series marks a spot height of 491 metres. This height in fact refers to a point about 100 metres south of the true summit; on closer inspection a 500 m ring contour may be discerned at the summit.

Geology
In common with much of the Northern Fells the Kirk Stile Formation of the Skiddaw Group predominates. This is composed of laminated mudstone and siltstone with greywacke sandstone and is of Ordovician age. There are minor intrusions of lamprophyre.

Wildlife
In recent years Dodd and Dodd Wood have become a magnet for visitors as the area around the southern end of Bassenthwaite Lake is home to one of the only four pairs of nesting Ospreys  in northern England, the other three being at Kielder Forest in Northumberland. An open-air viewing platform was opened on the slopes of Dodd in June 2001 which gives a clear view of the nest from a safe distance. Dodd Wood is one of the diminishing strongholds of the Red Squirrel in Great Britain and Forestry England, along with the Department for Environment, Food and Rural Affairs, have begun a campaign of protection from the Grey Squirrel.

Ascents
Dodd is generally climbed from the car park at the Old Sawmill tea room on the A591 road, opposite the Mirehouse; there is a waymarked route right up to the summit of the fell. It is possible to continue the walk from Dodd to take in the adjoining fell of Carl Side and then continue to the summit of Skiddaw, one of England's few 3,000-foot mountains.

Summit
The top of the fell is marked by a stone memorial pillar with a brass plaque that says "In memory of John Lole and Ian Sandelands, Ist Seaton Scout Group". The view from the top is excellent for a fell of modest height, encompassing the entirety of Bassenthwaite Lake and Derwent Water as well as the high mountains of Scafell Pike, Great Gable and Bowfell 21 km away to the south; the hills of Dumfries and Galloway are also visible to the north-west.
Computer-generated summit panorama

Skiddaw Hermit
In the 1860s, Dodd was home to a Scottish hermit called George Smith, who became known as the Skiddaw Hermit. He lived on a ledge on the fell in a wigwam type tent made from a framework of branches and built against a low stone wall. He stayed there in all weathers because he liked the outdoor life. He earned money by painting portraits and doing character assessment at local fairs. A short book was written about him in 1996 called the "Skiddaw Hermit" by Mary E. Burkett.

References
 A Pictorial Guide to Lakeland Fells, Northern Fells, Alfred Wainwright 
 Osprey Info at www.rspb.org 
 Osprey Info at www.ospreywatch.co.uk
 Dodd Wood Forestry England 
  Paragraph on Skiddaw Hermit from Cumberland News

Fells of the Lake District